Penzadieselmash (Penza diesel plant) is a Russian industrial enterprise, manufacturing diesel engines and related products. It was founded in 1948 and is now (2015) part of the Transmashholding group.

Products
Products include diesel engines, turbochargers and spare parts for these. Also water and oil pumps and flexible couplings.  Penza engines have been widely used in Russian diesel locomotives including classes TE2 (ТЭ2), TEM1 (ТЭМ1), TEM2 (ТЭМ2) and TEM3 (ТЭМ3).

Engines
 D-200 V4 V6 V8 from 500 kW to 1500 , V12 
 D-400 V12 turbodiesel
 Wartsila , B&W

References

Engine manufacturers of Russia
Manufacturing companies established in 1948
1948 establishments in Russia
Locomotive engine manufacturers
Diesel engine manufacturers
Marine engine manufacturers
Transmashholding
Companies based in Penza Oblast
Engine manufacturers of the Soviet Union
Pump manufacturers